Ballinknockane is the location of a National Monument in County Kerry, Ireland.

Location

Description

The national monument consists of a cillín (calluragh), an unconsecrated burial ground. Nearby is a cashel (stone ringfort) with souterrain (underground storage tunnel) and several hut sites.

Hut sites include:
Cloghaunnageragh ("Sheep Hut")
Cloghaunglass ("Green Hut")
Lisnagraigue

References

Buildings and structures in County Kerry
Tourist attractions in County Kerry
National Monuments in County Kerry